Kaifeng is a city in Henan, China.

Kaifeng may also refer to:

Kaifeng County, in Kaifeng, Henan, China
Kaifeng, Sichuan, a town in Jiange County, Sichuan, China
35366 Kaifeng, a main-belt minor planet
Kaifeng Jews
Siege of Kaifeng (disambiguation)
Mongol siege of Kaifeng

See also
Kai Feng (disambiguation), multiple people